Biljana Stojković (born 6 October 1972) is a Serbian biologist, activist, and professor at the University of Belgrade Faculty of Biology. Stojković was the candidate of the We Must coalition in the 2022 presidential election.

Early life 
Stojković was born on 6 October 1972 in Belgrade, SR Serbia, SFR Yugoslavia. She attended the Zemun Gymnasium, and in 1991, she enrolled into the Faculty of Biology at the University of Belgrade. She graduated in 1996, and in 1999 she received her master's degree. At one point, Stojković stayed in Switzerland in 1999, and there, she was offered to finish her postgraduate studies at the University of Basel, although she declined the offer and instead, she finished the studies in Belgrade. She received her PhD in 2007.

Career 

Stojković began her career as an assistant at the University of Belgrade in 1997, a role which she held until 2008. She was promoted to an assistant professor in 2008, and in 2013, she became an associate professor. In 2018, she became a full professor at the university. She teaches genetics and evolution, and at the Faculty of Philosophy, she also teaches genetics as an elective subject. Throughout her career, she has primarily worked on studies regarding genetics and evolution. Stojković gained notoriety as a scientist who has opposed to expel Darwin's theory from school curricula, and she was one of the few professors at the University of Belgrade who publicly supported the student blockade of the rectorate in 2019.

Politics 
Stojković was previously an independent politician, while she describes herself as a secular humanist, and she holds left-wing and anti-war views. She is an opponent of creationism, and she opposes religious studies as part of school curricula. Stojković has criticised the Serbian Progressive Party, and has called Aleksandar Vučić an autocrat. She opposes the recognition of Kosovo and opposes Serbia joining NATO. She participated in the protests throughout the 1990s, beginning with the 1991 protests in Belgrade. Stojković had also opposed Slobodan Milošević's regime.

She was a member of the Assembly of Free Serbia organisation. The organisation initially cooperated with parties inside the United Serbia coalition, although in early February 2022, the organisation began cooperating with the We Must coalition. On 27 February, the We Must coalition revealed Stojković as their presidential candidate. During the electoral campaign, Stojković stated her opposition to partocracy and support for European integrations. Stojković became one of the co-leaders of the Together political party on 11 June.

Personal life 
She is married to Oliver Stojković, a geneticist, and they have three children in total. Stojković is an author and she has published her work in international science magazines. She has been an editor for Peščanik since 2007. She received the "A Good Example of New Optimism" award in 2019.

Bibliography

Notes

References

Primary sources 
In the text these references are preceded by a double dagger (‡):

External links 

 

1972 births
Living people
Candidates for President of Serbia
Politicians from Belgrade
21st-century Serbian politicians
Serbian biologists
Serbian activists
Environmentalism in Europe
Academic staff of the University of Belgrade
Together (Serbia) politicians